Shamrocks & Shenanigans – The Best of House of Pain and Everlast is a best-of compilation album by American hip hop trio House of Pain including solo material recorded by the group's frontman Everlast. It was released on February 10, 2004, through Tommy Boy Records, Rhino Entertainment and Warner Records. Production was handled by DJ Muggs, Dante Ross, John Gamble, Bilal Bashir, Diamond D, Helmet, Scheme Team Productions, Quincy Jones III and House of Pain. It features guest appearances from Cokni O'Dire, Diamond D, Divine Styler, Donald D, Helmet, Ice-T and N'Dea Davenport.

The album is compiled of three songs from Everlast's 1990 debut studio album Forever Everlasting, four songs from House of Pain's 1992 debut studio album Fine Malt Lyrics, a song from 1993 Who's the Man? Original Motion Picture Soundtrack, a song from 1993 Music From the Motion Picture Judgment Night, three songs from House of Pain's 1994 second studio album Same As It Ever Was, a song from 1996 Eddie: The Soundtrack, a song from House of Pain's 1996 third and final studio album Truth Crushed to Earth Shall Rise Again, two songs from Everlast's 1998 second studio album Whitey Ford Sings the Blues, and a song from Everlast's 2000 third studio album Eat at Whitey's.

Track listing

References

External links

House of Pain albums
2004 compilation albums
Everlast (musician) albums
Albums produced by DJ Muggs
Albums produced by Diamond D
Albums produced by DJ Lethal
Albums produced by Dante Ross
Rhino Records compilation albums
Albums produced by Quincy Jones III
Albums produced by John Gamble (record producer)